Golbaf District is a district (bakhsh) in Kerman County, Kerman Province, Iran. At the 2006 census, its population was 12,979, in 3,117 families.  The District has one city: Golbaf.  The District has two rural districts (dehestan): Jowshan Rural District and Keshit Rural District.

References 

Kerman County
Districts of Kerman Province